Andrew Alleman (born November 20, 1983) is a former American football guard. He was drafted by the New Orleans Saints in the third round of the 2007 NFL Draft. He played college football at The University of Akron.

Alleman was also a member of the Miami Dolphins, Kansas City Chiefs and Indianapolis Colts.

Early years
Alleman grew up in Greentown, Ohio and played high school football at Massillon Washington High School in Massillon.

References

External links

1983 births
Living people
Players of American football from Akron, Ohio
American football defensive ends
American football offensive guards
American football centers
Pittsburgh Panthers football players
Akron Zips football players
New Orleans Saints players
Miami Dolphins players
Kansas City Chiefs players
Indianapolis Colts players
People from Stark County, Ohio